Coleophora chordoscelis is a moth of the family Coleophoridae. It is found in south-eastern India (Chennai in Tamil Nadu).

The head and thorax are glossy light grey, although the extreme lateral edge of the crown is whitish. The palpi are smooth and light grey with white edges. The antennae are stout towards the base and white suffusedly ringed with grey. The abdomen is light grey. The forewings are narrow-lanceolate and glossy light greyish-ochreous suffused with light grey. The hindwings and cilia are light grey.

References

chordoscelis
Moths described in 1917
Moths of Asia